The 2019 Mini Challenge season was the eighteenth season of the Mini Challenge UK. The season started on 20 April at Oulton Park and ended on 20 October at Snetterton Motor Racing Circuit. The season featured thirteen rounds across the UK.

Entry list

Calendar

Results

JCW Class

Cooper S Class

Cooper Pro Class

Cooper Am Class

Championship standings
Scoring system
Championship points were awarded for the first 34 positions in each Championship Race. Entries were required to complete 75% of the winning car's race distance in order to be classified and earn points. There were bonus points awarded for Pole Position where bonus points are awarded to the 6 fastest laps in and will score points from 6 to 1 in the order 6–5–4–3–2–1 and Fastest Lap where bonus points are awarded to the 6 fastest laps in and will score points from 6 to 1 in the order 6–5–4–3–2–1.

Championship Race points

Drivers' Championship

JCW Class

References

External links
Official website

Mini Challenge UK
Mini Challenge UK